Steven Roberts (born 1988/1989) is an American Democratic politician serving in the 5th district of the Missouri Senate. Roberts' election on January 6, 2021, made him the youngest black State Senator in Missouri history. Roberts previously served in the Missouri House of Representatives from 2017 to 2021. While in the House, he was selected by his colleagues to serve as Chairman of the Missouri Legislative Black Caucus. Roberts is also a member of the Air National Guard.

Roberts serves as the Minority Whip of the Missouri Senate.

Early life and education 
Steven Craig Roberts, II was born in St. Louis, Missouri to Eva Frazer, a medical doctor, and Steven Craig Roberts, Sr., a former St. Louis alderman.

Roberts graduated from the University of Miami with a Bachelor of Science in Psychology and Communication Studies and received his Juris Doctor degree from Pepperdine University School of Law. While in law school, Roberts worked in the U.S. Congress as a legislative intern; as a certified law clerk with the District Attorney’s Office in Compton, California; and assisted the Counsel to Secure Justice in New Delhi, India. During his final semester, Roberts worked with a clinic in Los Angeles, California that assisted with refugees fleeing persecution obtain asylum in the United States.

Early career 
After completing law school, Roberts joined AP Wireless Infrastructure Partners, LLC. Roberts returned to St. Louis in 2014 where he worked as an assistant circuit attorney. He was terminated in 2015, the circumstances of which are still in dispute. Roberts maintains he was asked to resign after he began collecting campaign money to run for Circuit Attorney, while former Circuit Attorney Jennifer Joyce's office stated, "...his termination was a result of his poor performance."

Military service 
Roberts joined the Missouri Air National Guard in 2018. After completing the Total Force Officer Training at Maxwell Air Force Base, Roberts was commissioned as a Second Lieutenant in the United States Air Force; dually serving as both a member of the Missouri Air National Guard as well as a member of the United States Air Force.

Roberts was promoted to the rank of Captain after graduating from the United States Air Force’s Judge Advocate Staff Officer Course (JASOC) in 2021.

Political career 
Roberts was elected to the Missouri House of Representatives in 2016 and served 2 two-year terms in Missouri’s 77th House District. In 2020, Roberts successfully ran for the Missouri Senate’s 5th District.

Missouri House of Representatives 
Roberts defeated three opponents during the 2016 Missouri House of Representatives District 77 Democratic primary. He ran unopposed in the General Election. Incumbent Roberts then defeated Kimberly-Ann Collins in his second Democratic primary on August 7, 2018, and won the General Election on November 6, 2018.

State representative

State senate

Allegations 
In April 2015, Roberts was arrested by St. Louis Metropolitan Police on suspicion of sexual assault and was suspended from his job at the Circuit Attorney's Office while the complaint was investigated. No charges were filed. In April 2017, the accuser filed a claim against Roberts for infliction of emotional distress; that suit was also dismissed. Roberts settled a civil case arising from the incident for $100,000.

In 2016, incoming State Representative Cora Faith Walker publicly accused Roberts of rape, which Roberts denied and, in response, filed a defamation lawsuit against Walker. In 2019, both Roberts and Walker dropped their respective legal actions, with their lawyers a jointly saying: "No money was paid in exchange for the dismissal of the parties' claims."

In 2022, allegations against Roberts resurfaced when it was found that content was removed from his Wikipedia page, using a Missouri State Capitol address. The settlement required confidentiality from both parties, which Roberts said the recently deceased Walker violated. The agreement included a possible $100,000 fine for each violation and a statement under Walker's name disputing any claim of assault.

References 

1980s births
Living people
Democratic Party members of the Missouri House of Representatives
Democratic Party Missouri state senators
Politicians from St. Louis